Phir Wahi Talash is a television show by director Lekh Tandon broadcast on Doordarshan in 1989–1990.

The show's theme ghazal Mere humsafar mere saath tum,  Kabhi haadson ki dagar mile kabhi muskilon ka safar mile was quite popular. This iconic ghazal 'Mere Humsafar mere Saath tum....' is sung by Shobhana Rao, an accomplished and talented ghazal and light music singer in New Delhi, India.

Synopsis 
The show is a love story between a well-to-do girl Padma (Poonam Rehani Sarin) and Ashwini Kumar, a boy from a poor family who is studying to be a BA Graduate, Ashwini's neighbor (Himani Shivpuri, in a brief role) likes him, whereas Padma has a strict father who is against the relationship and even gets her married to Sagar (Rakesh Kapoor). As Sagar(Rakesh Kapoor) is shown a person who had the modern thinking he lets go his wife to her love and sets her free.

Cast 
 Poonam Rehani Sarin as Padma
 Dr Ashwini Kumar as Narender
 Virendra Saxena as Narender's father
 Nutan Surya as Narender's mother
 Himani Shivpuri as Tara (Narender's neighbour)
 Rakesh Kapoor as Sagar
 Neelima Azeem as Shehnaz (Padma's friend)
 Rajesh Khattar as Captain Salim (Shehnaz's love interest)
 S M Zaheer as Shehnaz's father
 Sadia Dehlvi as Shehnaz's mother
 Arun Bali as Professor
 B.L. Chopra as Padma's father
 Veena Khanna as Padma's aunt
 Hemant Mishra as Madho (gardener)
 Gyan Shivpuri as Banwari
 Anil Bhatia as Satish (Narender's friend)
 Khalid as Aadil (Salim's brother)
 Anand Sharma as Girish (Sagar's father)
 Vinita Malik as Sagar's mother

References 

DD National original programming
1980s Indian television series
1989 Indian television series debuts
1990 Indian television series endings
Indian drama television series